Sipaliwini Airstrip  is an airstrip located near the village of Sipaliwini Savanna, in the most southern part of Suriname in the Sipaliwini District. It was constructed as part of Operation Grasshopper and the runway of the airstrip was publicly opened in 1962.

Charters and destinations 
Charter Airlines serving this airport are:

See also
 List of airports in Suriname
 Transport in Suriname

References

External links
OpenStreetMap - Sipaliwini Airstrip
OurAirports - Sipaliwini
FallingRain - Sipaliwini Airstrip

Airports in Suriname
Sipaliwini District